Canadian Wilderness (/ Three From Colorado) is a 1965 Spanish-Italian adventure drama western film directed by Amando de Ossorio. It stars George Martin and Luis Marín. The film was also known as Rebels in Canada.

Plot
Hudson river fur hunters rebel against their English masters. Victor, having joined the rebels, kidnaps Ann from the ruthless Hudson Bay agent, Sullivan, as a bartering tool while the rebels seek to disrupt and gain control of the company's business.

Cast

References

External links
 
 
 

1960s adventure drama films
Italian adventure drama films
Italian Western (genre) films
Spanish adventure drama films
Spanish Western (genre) films
Spaghetti Western films
1965 Western (genre) films
Films directed by Amando de Ossorio
Films scored by Carlo Savina
Films shot in Madrid
Films shot in Almería
Films shot in Italy
Films about kidnapping
Fur trade
1965 drama films
1965 films
Northern (genre) films
1960s Italian films